Ambelin Kwaymullina (born 1975 in Perth, Western Australia) is a Palyku novelist, illustrator, and assistant professor of law at the University of Western Australia.

She was born as the eldest of three children to Sally Morgan, an author and artist, and Paul Morgan, a teacher. She graduated from the University of Western Australia in 1998 with a Bachelor of Laws with honours. Kwaymullina's academic research focuses on both public law, and on Indigenous peoples and the law. Her works of fiction include both young adult science fiction novels and children's picture books.

Bibliography

Academic
"Indigenous Holistic Logic: Aspects, Consequences and Applications", (with Blaze Kwaymullina), Journal of Australian Indigenous Issues, Volume 17, Number 2, June 2014.
"Living Texts: A Perspective on Published Sources", (with Blaze Kwaymullina, B and Lauren Butterly) Indigenous Research Methodologies and Indigenous Worldviews, International Journal of Critical Indigenous Studies, Vol 6, No. 1, 2013.
"Learning to Read the Signs: Law in an Indigenous Reality", (with Blaze Kwaymullina) Journal of Australian Studies, Vol 34, Issue 2, 2010, pp. 195–208.
"Solid Rock, Sacred Ground: Cultural Vandalism in the Pilbara", (with Sally Morgan) Australian Feminist Law Journal, Vol 26, 2007.
"Living Together in Country: Creation, terra nullius and 'the trouble with tradition'", in Young, Simon The Trouble with Tradition: Native Title and Cultural Change, Federation Press, 2007.
"Bulldozing Stonehenge: Fighting for Cultural Heritage in the Wild Wild West", (with Sally Morgan and Blaze Kwaymullina) in Indigenous Law Bulletin, Vol. 6, Issue 20, 2006, pp 6–9.
"Seeing the Light: Aboriginal Law, Learning and Sustainable Living in Country", in Indigenous Law Bulletin, Vol. 6, Issue 11, 2005, pp 13–15.
"Tradeable Water Rights Implementation in Western Australia", (with R. Banyard) Environmental Law and Planning Journal, Vol. 17, No. 4, 2000.

Non-fiction 

 'Growing up, Grow up, Grown-Ups', Growing Up Aboriginal In Australia, Black Inc, Australia, 2018
Living on Stolen Land, Magabala Books, Australia, 2020

Novels

The Tribe series
The Interrogation of Ashala Wolf, Walker Books, Australia, 2012. (Shortlisted for Aurealis Awards)
The Disappearance of Ember Crow, Walker Books, Australia, 2013.
The Foretelling of Georgie Spider Walker Books, Australia, 2015.

Young adult fiction, co-authored with Ezekial Kwaymullina
Catching Teller Crow, Allen & Unwin, 2018. (Winner, 2019 Victorian Premier's Prize for Writing for Young Adults)

Picture books
The Lost Girl, Perth: Walker Books, 2014.
How Frogmouth Found Her Home, Fremantle: Fremantle Press, 2010.
Caterpillar and Butterfly, Fremantle: Fremantle Press, 2009.
Crow and the Waterhole, Fremantle: Fremantle Press, 2007.

References

1975 births
Indigenous Australian women academics
Australian women academics
Indigenous Australian writers
Australian children's writers
Australian science fiction writers
Australian women novelists
Australian women children's writers
Australian writers of young adult literature
Women writers of young adult literature
Living people
Indigenous Australian academics
University of Western Australia alumni
Academic staff of the University of Western Australia